Silnyy or Silny ("Strong") was a Soviet Navy Project 1135 Burevestnik-class Large Anti-Submarine Ship (BPK) or Krivak-class frigate. Displacing  full load, the vessel was built around the Metel anti-submarine missile system. Launched on 29 August 1972, Silnyy served with the Baltic Fleet. The vessel undertook a number of visits to nations friendly to the Soviet Union, including Cape Verde, Cuba, East Germany and Poland. In 1976, while escorting the aircraft carrier , the ship had a close encounter with the cruiser , although neither vessel was damaged. Silnyy was taken out of service for repairs in 1990. However, lack of funds meant that, instead, the ship was decommissioned on 30 June 1994 and broken up.

Design and development
Silnyy was one of twenty-one Project 1135 Burevestnik ("Petrel")-class ships launched between 1970 and 1981. Project 1135 was envisaged by the Soviet Navy as a less expensive complement to the Project 1134A Berkut A (NATO reporting name 'Kresta II') and Project 1134B Berkut B (NATO reporting name 'Kara') classes of anti-submarine cruisers, called Large Anti-Submarine Ships (BPK) by the Soviets.

The design was originally given to the TsKB-340 design bureau of Zelenodolsk, which had created the earlier Project 159 (NATO reporting name 'Petya') and Project 35 (NATO reporting name 'Mirka') classes. However, the expansion in the United States Navy ballistic missile submarine fleet and the introduction of longer-ranged and more accurate submarine-launched ballistic missiles led to a revisit of the project to deal with the new threat. The work was transferred to the TsKB-53 bureau in Leningrad who produced a substantially larger and more capable design. The design, created by N. P. Sobolov, combined a powerful missile armament with good seakeeping for a blue water role and shared the same BPK designation as the larger ships. This was amended to Guard Ship (SKR) from 28 July 1977 to reflect the change in Soviet strategy of creating protected areas for friendly submarines close to the coast. NATO forces called the new class 'Krivak'-class frigates.

Power was provided by two M7 power sets, each consisting of a combination of a  DK59 and a  M62 gas turbine linked in a COGAG arrangement and driving one fixed-pitch propeller. The ship's complement was 197, including 23 officers.

Silnyy initially had a primary mission of anti-submarine warfare and for this end was equipped with four URPK-3 Metel missiles (NATO reporting name SS-N-14 'Silex'), backed up by two quadruple torpedo tube mounts for  torpedoes and a pair of  RBU-6000 Smerch-2 anti-submarine rocket launchers. Defence against aircraft was provided by forty 4K33 OSA-M (SA-N-4 'Gecko') surface-to-air missiles which were launched from two sets of ZIF-122 launchers, each capable of launching two missiles. Two twin  AK-726 guns were mounted aft and two single mounts for  21-KM guns were carried on the superstructure. Provision was made for carrying 18 mines.

Silnyy had a well-equipped sensor suite, including a single MR-310A 'Angara-A' air/surface search radar, 'Volga'  and 'Don-2' navigation radars, MP-401S 'Start-S' ESM radar system and 'Spectrum-F' laser warning system. An extensive sonar complex was fitted, including MG-332 'Titan-2', which was mounted in a bow radome, and MG-325 'Vega'. The ship was also equipped with the PK-16 decoy-dispenser system.

Construction and career
Silnyy was laid down at the Yantar Shipyard in Kaliningrad on 15 March 1971, the third of the class to be constructed by the shipbuilder, and was given the yard number 154. The vessel was named for a Russian word which can be translated strong or fiery. Launched on 29 August 1972 and commissioned on 30 June the following year, the ship joined the Baltic Fleet.

In October 1974, Silnyy undertook the first of what would be number of visits to friendly nations. On 5 October, the vessel arrived at Gdynia along with sister ship , staying for four days. Silnyy returned on 26 June 1975 and staying for another five days. The ship also ventured further, crossing the Atlantic Ocean and, between 22 and 27 August 1976 and 11 and 15 October 1985, visited Havana, Cuba. On 10 October 1988, Silnyy started a four day visit to Praia, Cape Verde, and between 5 and 9 October 1989, could be found at Rostock in East Germany.  The vessel also visited Nigeria, hosting a local deputation onboard. The visits were termed "friendly" and were frequently part of a wider programme of activity and cultural exchange.

On 26 July 1976, the vessel was escorting the aircraft carrier  when the US Navy cruiser , which was shadowing the flotilla, approached closely. The US warship claimed that the Soviet ship "shouldered" it, which the Soviets denied. Neither vessel was damaged and the incident did not escalate.

On 3 December 1990, Silnyy sailed back to Kaliningrad to be repaired, and was there at the time of the dissolution of the Soviet Union on 26 December 1991. The ship was to be transferred to the Russian Navy. However, lack of funding instead meant that the ship was decommissioned on 30 June 1994 and was broken up at the Yantar shipyard between 1994 and 1995.

References

Citations

Bibliography

 
 
 
 
 
 
 
 
 
 

1972 ships
Krivak-class frigates
Ships built at Yantar Shipyard
Ships built in the Soviet Union
Cold War frigates of the Soviet Union